Simon Yakovlevich Rosenbaum (1860 in Pinsk, Russian Empire – 1934 in Tel Aviv, Palestine), was a Jewish activist and attorney, member of the First State Duma of the Russian Empire in 1906–1907, Lithuanian Minister for Jewish Affairs from June 29, 1923 to his resignation on February 12, 1924 and Lithuanian consul in Palestine.

References

1859 births
1934 deaths
People from Pinsk
People from Pinsky Uyezd
Belarusian Jews
Jews from the Russian Empire
Russian Constitutional Democratic Party members
Members of the 1st State Duma of the Russian Empire
Members of the Seimas
Minister for Jewish Affairs of Lithuania
Honorary consuls of Lithuania
Russian Zionists
Lithuanian emigrants to Mandatory Palestine
Ashkenazi Jews in Mandatory Palestine
Burials at Trumpeldor Cemetery